The Durham Liber Vitae is a confraternity book produced in north-eastern England in the Middle Ages. It records the names of visitors to the church of the bishopric of Durham, and its predecessor sees at Lindisfarne and Chester-le-Street. In England, it is the oldest book of this type, although it is paralleled by later English confraternity books, most notably the New Minster Liber Vitae.

Original Anglo-Saxon Liber Vitae
The text was originally of the 9th century, but was continually supplemented thereafter by entries made in the 10th century and later.

The 9th-century core constitutes folios 15–45, with folio 47. It is generally believed by scholars that it was produced in the church of Lindisfarne, though Monkwearmouth-Jarrow monasteries have also been suggested. This had been composed c. 840. It has been damaged over time, and the original binding is now lost. It consisted of parchment sheets on which were written lists of names, followed by blank sections for future additions.

The book was at Durham by the later 11th century, as indicated by the list of Durham monks on folio 45 from the episcopate of Ranulf Flambard. Later additions to the early core were made to folios 24r, 36r, 44v and 45r.

High and Later Middle Ages
The book was reorganised in the third quarter of the 12th century, and it is likely that many of the names originally there did not survive. The form it attained at that point appears to be the one it kept until the 15th century, although it was continually updated with new entries. After 1300 very few names were added to the original core.

The Liber Vitae is currently in the British Library, where it is classified as BL, MS Cotton Domitian vii. The manuscript itself is 205 x 142 mm.

Notes

Sources
 
 
 
 
 . Also available from Internet Archive.

Further reading

. Facsimile edition, now superseded by the digital facsimile edition prepared by David and Lynda Rollason.
Online facsilime at the British Library

External links
 The Durham Liber Vitae project

History of Durham, England
History of Northumberland
Northumbria
Religion in County Durham
Christianity in medieval England
English manuscripts
9th-century manuscripts
Cotton Library